Geoffrey C. Bowker is Professor of Informatics at the University of California, Irvine. He moved to UCI at the start of 2012, having held the positions of Professor and Senior Scholar in Cyberscholarship at the University of Pittsburgh School of Information. Prior to that, Bowker was Executive Director and Regis and Dianne McKenna Professor at the Center for Science, Technology and Society at Santa Clara University. Previously, Bowker was chair of the Department of Communication at the University of California - San Diego and has held appointments at the
University of Illinois at Urbana-Champaign.

With his late partner Susan Leigh Star, he has devoted much of his career to examining the values embedded within sociotechnical infrastructures such as databases, visualization strategies, and science and engineering standards. "To classify is human," as it says in their mutual work, meaning that it's a human instinct to classify things. 

With Helen Nissenbaum, he founded the NSF funded Values in Design network to bring together scholars examining these issues across broader sites of study and across disciplines.

Selected works
 Sorting Things Out: Classification and its Consequences, MIT Press, 1999. (co-authored with Susan Leigh Star). 
 Memory Practices in the Sciences, MIT Press, 2005. 
 Understanding Infrastructure: Dynamics, Tensions, and Design, 2007.

References

External links
Homepage
EVOKE Lab

Year of birth missing (living people)
Living people
University of California, Irvine faculty